Llangennech Rugby Football Club are a Welsh rugby union club based in Llangennech in Carmarthenshire, Wales. Llangennech RFC is a member of the Welsh Rugby Union.

Llangennech Rugby Football Club was established in 1885, when enthusiasm for the game had spread across local villages after Llanelli won the South Wales trophy.

Since then Llangennech has had a side that has played in every rugby season since 1885, with only the two World wars breaking the run.

The First XV play in the WRU Division One West. There are over 200+ registered mini & junior players, with teams from Under 7's right up to Under 16's. 20+ Youth and 30+ Senior players. Along with vice-presidents, patrons, members, officers and committee, the club membership is over 400.

Club honours
WRU Division 8A West - Champions
WRU Division 5 West - Champions
WRU Division 3 West - Champions
West Wales Rugby Union - Section 'B' - Champions 1984-85
West Wales Rugby Union Cup Winners 2004-05

Results

2022/23

Current First XV squad

Management

Notable past players
See also :Category:Llangennech RFC players
There are a number of players who have both represented Llangennech RFC and have also been capped at international level.
  Rhys Gabe
  Cliff Williams
  Idwal Davies (rugby)
  Terry Davies - Played for Llangennech Youth
  Alun Thomas
  Brian Davies - Son of Idwal Davies above
  Gavin Evans
  Lowri Harries
  Adam Warren
  Sam Parry

There are players who have represented Llangennech RFC and then gone on to excel in other Sports.

  Gareth Price (rugby league) - Rugby League
  Idwal Davies (rugby) - Rugby League
  Les Thomas - Rugby League
  Steffan Jones - Cricket
  Flex Lewis - Bodybuilding - Played for Llangennech Youth

References

Further reading 

 
 

Welsh rugby union teams
Sport in Carmarthenshire
Llanelli Rural